Pachybathron cassidiforme is a species of sea snail, a marine gastropod mollusk, in the family Cystiscidae.

References

cassidiforme
Gastropods described in 1853
Cystiscidae